Gavran (also, Gyarvan and Gyavran) is a village and municipality in the Yardymli Rayon of Azerbaijan.  It has a population of 584.

References 

Populated places in Yardimli District